Aphaenogaster beccarii is an Asian species of ant in the subfamily Myrmicinae found from Indonesia, India, Nicobar Islands, and China.

References

External links

 at antwiki.org
Itis.gov
Animaldiversity.org

becarii
Hymenoptera of Asia